Jerron "Blind Boy" Paxton (born January 26, 1989) is an American musician from Los Angeles. A vocalist and multi-instrumentalist, Paxton's style draws from blues and jazz music before World War II and was influenced by Fats Waller and "Blind" Lemon Jefferson. According to Will Friedwald in The Wall Street Journal, Paxton is "virtually the only music-maker of his generation — playing guitar, banjo, piano and violin, among other implements — to fully assimilate the blues idiom of the 1920s and '30s, the blues of Bessie Smith and Lonnie Johnson."

Background
Originally from the Watts district of Los Angeles, Paxton's grandparents moved from Louisiana to California in 1956. These Southern roots would have an influence on Paxton as a young boy. After spending time listening to his hometown blues radio station, as well as the old Cajun and country blues songs his grandmother used to sing, Paxton became interested in these early sounds, developing a breadth of knowledge pertaining to such music along the way. He began playing the fiddle when he was twelve, only to pick up the banjo two years later. He is Jewish. He graduated from Verbum Dei High School in 2007.

As a teenager, he began to go blind, losing most of his eyesight by the age of 16.  As a Verbum Dei student, he had a corporate work-study assignment at the Braille Institute of America.

Career 
In 2007, Paxton moved to upstate New York to attend Marist College and soon after began playing gigs in and around the Brooklyn area. Although not signed to a record label, he continued to play old-time, blues, and roots festivals throughout the United States, as well as various shows opening for old-time string bands including The Dust Busters.

Paxton was named artistic director of the Port Townsend Acoustic Blues Workshop and Festival in 2014 by Centrum in Port Townsend, Washington.  He succeeded musicians Daryl Davis, Corey Harris and Phil Wiggins in the role.

Living Blues placed Paxton on the cover of their issue entitled "The Next Generation of the Acoustic Blues," in December 2012.

In 2014, he voiced and sang the lines of "The Highwayman", a character from the fourth episode of Over the Garden Wall, "Songs of the Dark Lantern".

In 2017, Paxton appeared in the award-winning documentary film The American Epic Sessions, directed by Bernard MacMahon, recording Blind Gary Davis's “Candy Man” on the first electrical sound recording system from the 1920s.

Artistry 
Paxton's talent and contributions to acoustic blues have earned him comparisons to contemporary artists such as Taj Mahal, Keb' Mo', and Corey Harris. Similar to groups such as the Carolina Chocolate Drops, he is one of the few contemporary African-American banjo players touring today. Since his childhood, he has added piano, harmonica, Cajun accordion, ukulele, guitar, and the bones to his musical arsenal, although the banjo was his first serious instrument. In addition to blues and jazz, he uses these instruments to play ragtime, country blues, and Cajun music.

Discography

Albums 

 Direct-To-Disc - Volume 1 - Analogue Productions Originals - AAPO 029 (2012) - UPC:753088602917
 Direct-To-Disc - Volume 2 - Analogue Productions Originals - AAPO 030 (2012) - UPC:753088603013
 Recorded Music For Your Entertainment (2015)

EPs 

 Jalopy Records 7" Series: Jerron Paxton (2018)

Singles 

 2012: "Dirtiest Little Darling"/"Railroad Bill"

References

External links

 
 
 Jerron "Blind Boy" Paxton on Spotify
 The Country Blues: Jerron "Blind Boy" Paxton
 Down Home Radio Show: Interview with Blind Boy Paxton
 Down Home Radio Show: Blind Boy Paxton on Down Home TV

1989 births
21st-century American guitarists
21st-century American pianists
African-American Jews
African-American guitarists
American blues guitarists
American blues harmonica players
American blues pianists
American blues singers
American male guitarists
American male pianists
Blind musicians
Guitarists from Los Angeles
Living people
Singers from Los Angeles
African-American pianists
21st-century African-American male singers